The Ficedula flycatchers are a genus of Old World flycatchers. The genus is the largest in the family, containing around thirty species. They have sometimes been included in the genus Muscicapa. The genus is found in Europe, Asia and Africa. Several species are highly migratory, whereas other species are sedentary.

Taxonomy and systematics
The genus was introduced by the French naturalist Mathurin Jacques Brisson in 1760 with the European pied flycatcher (Ficedula hypoleuca) as the type species. The genus name is from Latin and refers to a small fig-eating bird (ficus, "fig") supposed to change into the blackcap in winter.

Extant species

The genus contains the following species:
 Rusty-tailed flycatcher (Ficedula ruficauda)
 European pied flycatcher (Ficedula hypoleuca)
 Atlas pied flycatcher (Ficedula speculigera)
 Collared flycatcher (Ficedula albicollis)
 Semicollared flycatcher (Ficedula semitorquata)
 Yellow-rumped flycatcher (Ficedula zanthopygia)
 Narcissus flycatcher (Ficedula narcissina)
Ryukyu flycatcher (Ficedula owstoni)
 Green-backed flycatcher (Ficedula elisae)
 Mugimaki flycatcher (Ficedula mugimaki)
 Slaty-backed flycatcher (Ficedula erithacus)
 Pygmy flycatcher (Ficedula hodgsoni)
 Rufous-chested flycatcher (Ficedula dumetoria)
 Tanimbar flycatcher (Ficedula riedeli)
 Rufous-gorgeted flycatcher (Ficedula strophiata)
 Red-breasted flycatcher (Ficedula parva)
 Taiga flycatcher (Ficedula albicilla)
 Kashmir flycatcher (Ficedula subrubra)
 Snowy-browed flycatcher (Ficedula hyperythra)
 Little slaty flycatcher (Ficedula basilanica)
 Rufous-throated flycatcher (Ficedula rufigula)
 Cinnamon-chested flycatcher (Ficedula buruensis)
 Damar flycatcher (Ficedula henrici)
 Sumba flycatcher (Ficedula harterti)
 Palawan flycatcher (Ficedula platenae)
 Cryptic flycatcher (Ficedula crypta)
 Bundok flycatcher (Ficedula luzoniensis) 
 Furtive flycatcher (Ficedula disposita)
 Lompobattang flycatcher (Ficedula bonthaina)
 Little pied flycatcher (Ficedula westermanni)
 Ultramarine flycatcher (Ficedula superciliaris)
 Slaty-blue flycatcher (Ficedula tricolor)
 Sapphire flycatcher (Ficedula sapphira)
 Black-and-orange flycatcher (Ficedula nigrorufa)
 Black-banded flycatcher (Ficedula timorensis)

Former species
Formerly, some authorities also considered the following species (or subspecies) as species within the genus Ficedula:
 Indian black-naped blue monarch (as Siphia Styani)

Speciation 
A 2015 study on genomic pattern of differentiation, also known as islands of speciation by Burri et al., in the Ficedula flycatchers. Islands of differentiation are genomic regions with elevated measures of genetic differentiation. The authors examined island of differentiation within genomes and sought to answer (1) how they are formed and (2) what role they have in speciation. The flycatcher species complex is made up of four sister species and has a broad species range over all of Europe and parts of North Africa. The authors sequenced 200 genomes from 10 populations to an average of 14x coverage.

The authors tested two prominent models for the accumulation of islands of speciation, speciation with gene flow and linkage selection. Some of the expected patterns for islands of differentiation forming accumulating under a gene flow model and reduced sequence divergence outside the islands of differentiation compared to the rest of the genome and expansion of the islands of differentiation as reproductive isolation is reinforced during the speciation process. Based on the genomic data, expectations from the speciation with gene flow model were not well supported. Instead there was more support for the linkage selection model for islands of variation model. Such as an inverse correlation between recombination rate and differentiation, low amounts of ancestral variation in low recombining regions, and a positive relationship with nucleotide diversity and recombination rate.
Some of the main findings from the study were:

The differentiation landscapes were very similar across the four flycatcher species.
Tests using population genetic parameters to test assumptions indicated that differentiation landscape across the genomes were likely not caused by gene flow.
The signatures for background selection highly outweighed selective sweep signatures.

By reinforcement 
F. hypoleuca vis-a-vis F. albicollis are speciating from each other by reinforcement, as evidenced by differences between colouration in sympatry versus allopatry. This is evidence for speciation by reinforcement.

Description
The flycatchers in the genus Ficedula are typically small with slender bodies and rounded heads. In many cases they are sexually dimorphic in their plumage, with the males being brightly or strikingly coloured and the females being duller or drabber.

References

Further reading

Lei, X., Lian, Z.-M., Lei F.-M., Yin Z.-H., Zhao H.-F. 2007. Phylogeny of some Muscicapinae birds based on cyt b mitochondrial gene sequences. Acta Zoologica Sinica, 53(1):95 - 105. PDF fulltext 

 
Bird genera
Taxa named by Mathurin Jacques Brisson